Michael William Ovenden FRSE FRAS (1926 – 1987) was a 20th-century British astronomer who was President of the Astronomical Society of Glasgow and Professor of Astronomy at University of British Columbia.

Life

He was born on 21 May 1926 in the Muswell Hill district of north London. His first degree was from Queen Mary College, London in 1947. He then went to Cambridge University where he received an MA.

In 1953 he began lecturing in Astronomy at Glasgow University being promoted to Senior Lecturer in 1964.

In 1964 he was elected a Fellow of the Royal Society of Edinburgh. His proposers were Peter Alan Sweet, Hermann Bruck, Hugh Butler, and  Peter Fellgett.

In 1966 he emigrated to Canada to take the role as Professor of Astronomy at the University of British Columbia.

He retired in 1985 due to ill-health and died of a heart attack on 15 March 1987 in Vancouver in Canada.

Publications

Recent Advances in Science (1952)
The Deflection of Light by the Solar Gravitational Field (1952)
Looking at the Stars (1957)
Artificial Satellites (1960)
Life in the Universe (1962)
On the Satellite Capture Problem (1975) with John Byl

References

1926 births
1987 deaths
People from Muswell Hill
20th-century British astronomers
Fellows of the Royal Society of Edinburgh
Academics of the University of Glasgow